Rembrandt Enterprises (REI) is an American company, headquartered in Spirit Lake, Iowa. The company is named after its most prominent egg operation in Rembrandt, Iowa; one of the world's largest in-line egg producing and further processing facilities. It first started operations in 2000 and Rembrandt Foods shipped its first order in 2001. They now offer a wide variety of egg products in dried, liquid, frozen, pre-cooked and hard-cooked formats. Rembrandt Foods has a dedicated pilot plant, lab and test kitchen at its headquarters. 

REI is a legacy company of Taylor Corporation based in North Mankato, Minnesota.

History 
In the late 1990s, Darrel and his son David Rettig were attempting to construct a highly autonomous egg laying facility. With the financial backing of Glen Taylor, REI became reality. Sustainable agriculture was as the center of the development, resulting in the creation of Farm Nutrients (FN). FN utilizes chicken litter and other biproducts of egg production as field nourishment.

References 
http://www.rembrandtfoods.com/index.htm
http://www.rembrandtinc.net/
http://www.pr-inside.com/rembrandt-enterprises-inc-to-acquire-the-r968971.htm
http://www.tcbmag.com/peoplecompanies/businessleaders/116947p2.aspx
https://www.agweek.com/news/activists-at-timberwolves-games-protest-avian-influenza-depopulation-but-vets-say-its-the-humane-choice

Companies based in Iowa